Operación Fangio is a 1999 Argentine-Cuban drama-suspense historical film directed by Alberto Lecchi and starring Darío Grandinetti. The film's subject is the 1958 kidnapping of Juan Manuel Fangio in Havana, Cuba, ahead of the 1958 Cuban Grand Prix.

References 

1999 films
1990s sports drama films
Argentine sports drama films
Cuban drama films
Argentine auto racing films
Cuban auto racing films
Films set in Havana
Films set in the 1950s
Fiction set in 1958
Films about kidnapping
Biographical films about sportspeople
Cultural depictions of Juan Manuel Fangio
Films directed by Alberto Lecchi
1999 drama films
Juan Manuel Fangio
1990s Argentine films